In mathematics, K-homology is a homology theory on the category of locally compact Hausdorff spaces. It classifies the elliptic pseudo-differential operators acting on the vector bundles over a space. In terms of -algebras, it classifies the Fredholm modules over an algebra. 

References 
 N. Higson and J. Roe, Analytic K-homology. Oxford University Press, 2000.

K-theory
Homology theory